BCJ may refer to 

Bachelor of Communication and Journalism
Bachelor of Criminal Justice
Bach Collegium Japan
Bohlin Cywinski Jackson
BCJ (algorithm), a method of improving the compression of machine code